The Hill Correctional Center (HCC) is a medium-security adult male prison of the Illinois Department of Corrections in Galesburg, Illinois. The prison was opened in October 1986 and has an operational capacity of 1,867 prisoners.

References

Prisons in Illinois
1986 establishments in Illinois